Prashant Tripathi, known as Acharya Prashant, is an Indian author, and an Advaita teacher. He teaches seventeen forms of Gita and sixty forms of Upanishads. He is the founder of a non-profit organization named PrashantAdvait Foundation, and is a vegan activist.

Early life and education 
Prashant Tripathi received his bachelor's degree in engineering from IIT Delhi and later did post graduation in management from IIM Ahmedabad in 2003. He worked for Indian Civil Services briefly before starting as a Vedanta teacher and an author.

Reception 
The Times of India, in their review of Acharya's Karma: Why Everything You Know About It Is Wrong, remarked that while the book "presents the cryptic teachings of the Upanishads in a contemporary and relatable manner", its usage of terms from Advaita Vedanta makes it a difficult read for a layman. The Financial Express wrote that the four sections of Karma mirror the four stages in the life of a seeker, and that the book "is not a classic case of prolific and bestselling authors in self-help segment repackaging and remarketing their existing body of work." Dainik Bhaskar observed that the author has quoted from the Vedas and spiritual texts like the Bhagavad Gita and Ramcharitmanas to substantiate his perspective on the concept of Karma. A "micro review" of Karma in The Times of India called it a book which helped the reader understand their Karma better. In August 2021, the book topped the Nielsen Bookscan's bestseller list, and in October 2021, secured eighth position in the bestseller list released by The Asian Age.

Dainik Jagran wrote about Acharya's Sambandh that "the best part about the book is that it has been written in the everyday spoken language and contains examples that are easy to understand. It is, however, difficult to keep the pace with his [author's] thoughts and writings." Punjab Kesari called Sambandh "a mirror to human relationships"; and highlighted the need for better structuring of the book.

In an article titled New Light on Ancient Texts: Illumination or Nebulation published in The North East Times, Acharya Prashant was criticized for his interpretation of some central Indic concepts like reincarnation (punarjanma), enlightenment (moksha), liberation (mukti) and action (karma). Some of his interpretations were reported to be strikingly at odds with the ones provided by some of the ancient and acclaimed commentators, forming the core of the common Indic identity. Shubham Ahuja concluded his article by the comment, It is hard to believe that many of the well-known gurus and commentators whose interpretations are openly and strongly refuted by Acharya were fundamentally mistaken.

See also 
 Advaita Vedanta
 Upanishads
 Veganism

References 

Indian spiritual teachers
1978 births
Living people
IIT Delhi alumni
Advaitin philosophers
Indian Hindus
Indian spiritual writers
Indian Institute of Management Ahmedabad alumni
Indian veganism activists